Qaynān was a god worshipped by the Sabaean people in pre-Islamic South Arabia.  Based on etymology, Qaynān may have been the god of smiths.

References

Arabian gods
Smithing gods